The 2002 ISF Women's World Championship for softball was held July 26-August 4, 2002 in Saskatoon, Canada.  The United States, which went undefeated for the tournament, won a fifth straight world championship with a 1-0 victory over Japan. The first four teams qualified for the 2004 Olympics.

Pool Play

Group A

Group B

Playoffs

Day One

Puerto Rico and Italy Eliminated.

Day Two

Australia and New Zealand Eliminated.

Medal Round

Final ranking

References

Women's Softball World Championship
Sports competitions in Saskatoon
2002 in Canadian women's sports
International softball competitions hosted by Canada
Softball World Championship
July 2002 sports events in Canada
August 2002 sports events in Canada
2002 in Saskatchewan
Women in Saskatchewan